Proinsias Cassidy, also known mononymously simply as Proinsias or Cassidy, is a fictional character and antihero in the Garth Ennis comic book series Preacher and The Boys, respectively co-created with Steve Dillon and Darick Robertson, and the former's spin-off prequel Cassidy: Blood and Whiskey. Introduced as a drug-and-alcohol-addicted Irish vampire en route to Dallas to open a bar called "The Grassy Knoll", Cassidy ultimately joins Jesse Custer and Tulip O'Hare on their search for God, becoming Jesse's best friend and falling in love with Tulip. After Jesse's apparent death, Cassidy and Tulip form a romance, which ends on Jesse's return, with their rivalry leading to a duel. Wishing to atone for all that he has done in life, Cassidy walks into the sunlight to die. However, having made a deal with God before his confrontation with Jesse, in order to allow Genesis (deemed a threat to God) to be destroyed, Cassidy ensures that both he and Jesse will be resurrected, before God himself is killed by the Saint of Killers. As Jesse leaves looking for Tulip, the redeemed Cassidy watches his first sunset in years as a human being, pledging to act like a man. In an epilogue in the fourth volume of The Boys, set years later, a more heavyset Cassidy (now going by his first name) has finally opened his "The Grassy Knoll" bar (albeit in New York City instead). Closing his bar on St. Patrick's Day so that he and fellow former alcoholic and friend Billy Butcher can speak in peace, the two discuss their struggles with addiction before Butcher's protégé Hughie Campbell arrives, and Cassidy closes up his bar, smiling.

Cassidy is portrayed by Joe Gilgun in AMC's 2016–2019 television series adaptation of Preacher, and voiced by Michael John Casey in GraphicAudio's 2020 audio play series adaptation of The Boys. The character has received a positive critical reception, with the comic series' version analysed as a stereotypical example of European people, and the television series' version and Gilgun's portrayal praised for their depiction of interpersonal relationships, bisexuality, and a different character ending.

Appearances

Comic book series

Preacher

As a young adult in 1916, Dublin, Cassidy joined the Irish Volunteers and took part in the Easter Rising, with his brother Billy also joining to keep watch over him. After Billy forces Cassidy to desert the army to prevent him from being killed, Cassidy is bitten by a "hag", who leaves him with seemingly fatal injuries. His body falls into the water, and he soon learns that he is not succumbing to the injuries and that the sun burns his skin: the hag was a vampire, and now so is he. Cassidy begins to wear sunglasses to hide his eyes, which are now blood red as part of his transformation into a vampire. Not wanting to explain himself to his family or comrades, Cassidy decides to travel to the United States, living there in squalor for almost a century, figuring out how to subsist on alcohol and drugs instead of blood, but inadvertently making him parasitical and irresponsible with a remarkable lack of forethought, causing harm and death to those around him when he abandons them to circumstances he set in motion, leading many former partners off his to end up critically injured, hopelessly addicted to drugs, or dead. After he gets the girlfriend of a friend of his killed during the "Dixie Fried" story arc, Xavier, who is a Voodoo priest says "I honestly don't believe he's an evil man. Just careless. And thoughtless. And terribly, terribly weak."

In Preacher, while hitchhiking to Dallas, intending to found a bar there called "The Grassy Knoll" while on the run from Les Enfants du Sang, Cassidy is picked up by Tulip O'Hare, and meets the preacher Jesse Custer; after saving them from a confrontation, he elects to join them on their mission to find the actual (missing) biblical God. Over the course of their adventures, Cassidy forms a strong friendship with Jesse and eventually falls in love with Tulip, though she initially does not reciprocate the feelings. After Jesse forces Cassidy to drop him from a plane using the Word of God, in order too save Cassidy and Tulip, he also orders Cassidy to confess his love to Tulip, and the two begin a relationship, taking up heavy drugs and alcohol together while mourning Jesse, before eventually breaking up. After Jesse returns and reunites with Tulip, he vows to kill Cassidy on learning of her addiction, although Tulip asks him not to. Reuniting with Jesse, Cassidy is told that Jesse no longer wants anything to do with him, though the two agree to meet one more time for a final duel, engaging in a fist fight that Jesse's skills easily allows him to dominate, while constantly berating Cassidy. When Cassidy finally accepts his failures in life and death, and begins, as Jesse puts it, "acting like a man," Jesse takes Cassidy's hand in forgiveness: Cassidy then proves he is worth the gesture by walking into the sunrise to atone for all he has done, burning up in the process.

Once Jesse is gunned down by the Grail, it is revealed that Cassidy had made a deal with God hours before his confrontation with Jesse; he would beat Jesse to the point of surrender and allow Genesis to be destroyed. In return, God must allow both Jesse and Cassidy to live. Despite events not quite going to plan, God keeps His word. Jesse is revived and goes looking for Tulip, while the redeemed Cassidy watches his first sunset in years as a human being, then drives off with a pledge to act like a man.

Cassidy: Blood and Whiskey
In Cassidy: Blood and Whiskey, a prequel to the main events of Preacher, Cassidy encounter another vampire for the first time in his lifetime, named Eccarius, who behaves in-line with vampire stereotypes, and who is worshipped by a New Orleans-based gothic cult, Les Enfants du Sang (The Children of Blood). After failing to convince Eccarius that he can survive without needing to consume blood, and his inner bloodlust is just that, Cassidy ties Eccarius to a cross to die in the sun, setting up his followers (Les Enfants du Sang) mission of vengeance against him in Preacher.

The Boys
In the "We Gotta Go Now" arc of The Boys, set years after Cassidy's redemption, the now-human and heavyset Cassidy has grown a ponytail and opened his "The Grassy Knoll" bar in New York City, wearing a t-shirt with "careful now" inscribed on it (in reference to Father Ted). After ejecting a group of drunk Irish-Americans dressed as Irish stereotypes from his bar on St. Patrick's Day by throwing an axe at the wall behind them, Cassidy returns to his ongoing conversation with his British friend and former drinking buddy Billy Butcher about both being recovering alcoholics, and reminiscing about times in the past when they would have gone out drinking and acted like as "Stage Irishman", before both drink club sodas, toasting to the Alcoholics Anonymous mantra of taking it "one day at a time", serving as each other's sponsor; Cassidy is notably the only character in The Boys to address Butcher simply as Billy, while Butcher addresses Cassidy simply as Proinsias. After Butcher's Scottish protégé "Wee Hughie" Campbell arrives in the bar from his undercover assignment with the G-Men, and hears Cassidy can write "fuck off" in the head of a pint of Guinness, he orders such a drink before discussing his assignment with Butcher. As the two leave, Cassidy silently closes up his bar, smiling.

Television series

Preacher (2016–2019)

In the 2016–2019 AMC television series adaptation, Joe Gilgun portrays the character. Unlike the comic series, Cassidy usually appears without his trademark sunglasses, and has normal eyes.

Season One (2016)

In the first season, working in a corporate jet as a flight attendant, Proinsias Cassidy drinks with a group of hedge funders while telling them his last trip to Tijuana. After discovering a Bible in the bathroom, whose pages are covered in thick notes scrawled all over them, Cassidy notes via the angles of the outside of the plane that is not flying toward Tijuana. He then kills the hedge funders and pilots, who turn out to be assassins there to kill him. Cassidy reveals himself a vampire by drinking the pilot's blood and jumping out of the soon-to-crash plane (the assassins having been vampire hunters) with a to-go bottle of blood and umbrella in hand. Cassidy, whose guts lie around him in a crater in a nearby cornfield, protected from the sunlight by the shadow of a cow, lures said cow in and devours it, regenerating his flesh. That night, Cassidy goes to local bar to contact his sponsor on the phone as to what he should do next, in the process befriending local preacher Jesse Custer. Impressed by witnessing Jesse beat up who he believes to be the abusive husband of one of his churchgoers (due to the husband's son mistaking his parents' BDSM activities for abuse) and his friends, before joining him in a jail cell overnight after being mistaken by local Sheriff Root for Jesse's accomplice, the two men shake hands after Jesse is released on bail before parting ways.

Three days after Jesse is then possessed by Genesis (the offspring of an angel and demon whose powers rival that of God), he learns that Cassidy had found him passed out at the church and has since moved into the attic, carrying out basic maintenance on the church itself, caring for him during his recovery. Cassidy then attends Jesse's next sermon, the latter's faith renewed. That night, after Jesse passes out from taking a drink from Cassidy's flask, two angels, DeBlanc and Fiore, arrive seeking to retrieve Genesis. Mistaking them for more vampire hunters seeking to kill him, Cassidy fights and kill the angels, burying their bodies, before they immediately regenerate elsewhere (as angels do, being unable to die naturally). After learning from Jesse of his newfound abilities of control over others, which he believes to be the "Word of God", Cassidy is tracked down by DeBlanc and Fiore, who explain to him the true nature of Genesis and how they must return it to Heaven. Acting as Jesse's representative without his knowledge, Cassidy agrees to sell Genesis back to the angels in exchange for copious amounts of money, drugs and alcohol. After failing to convince a distracted Jesse about the angels and Genesis, Cassidy elects to do so the following day, proceeding to a local brothel to engage prostitutes. However, while having sex, Cassidy is mistakenly thrown out of a window by Jesse's estranged girlfriend Tulip O'Hare (whom had mistaken him for someone else she was angered at), and drives him to a hospital, believing he will otherwise die. With Tulip holding him in her arms, Cassidy falls in love with her.

At the hospital, Cassidy replenishes himself by drinking bags of blood, revealing himself to Tulip as a vampire. The next day, Tulip and Cassidy bond after learning of Cassidy's secret and eventually have sex, while DeBlanc informs Jesse about Genesis; in anger, Jesse then accidentally banishes local teenager Eugene Root to Hell in proximity to Cassidy. Confronting Jesse and his attempts at justifying sending Eugene to Hell, Cassidy hands Jesse a fire extinguisher and informing him that he trusts him to do the right thing, exposes himself to sunlight, burning himself alive and revealing himself as a vampire. Although extinguished by Jesse and left to regenerate, Cassidy is left in an amount of pain. and cared for by Tulip. After failing to regenerate Cassidy with the blood of several animals, Tulip asks local resident Emily to take care of Cassidy while she "takes care of" someone else who had betrayed her and Jesse; on seeing just what Cassidy really is, Emily decides to kill her lover (the mayor) by feeding him to Cassidy. Sheriff Root realizes Cassidy is a vampire and attempts to use his immortality as torture to find Eugene's whereabouts himself, believing Jesse to have killed him. The following Sunday, Jesse uses the angels' phone to summon an image of God to his church, which Cassidy, Tulip and the congregation remain in awe of. However, on realising this "God" is the imposter and the actual God fled Heaven on Genesis' release, Jesse, Cassidy and Tulip leave, oblivious to the town then being destroyed due to residents of the congregation (their faith broken) then neglecting their jobs at the local methane power plant. After electing to join Tulip and Jesse as they search for God, Cassidy lounges in the back of their car.

Season Two (2017)

Jesse, Tulip, and Cassidy start their journey to find God, which is quickly put on hold after a police car flags them down and they go on a car chase involving multiple police cars, before escaping the Saint of Killers. Investigating Tammy, a strip club manager has supposedly seen God frequent the club for its jazz music, who is then killed after Cassidy's altercation with one of her security guards leads to Tammy being accidentally shot. After escaping the Saint of Killers again, Cassidy recalls having seen Fiore on television, now working a novelty act where he kills himself and comes back to life at an Indian-style casino and hotel. On revealing he hired the Saint of Killers, Cassidy convinces Fiore to call him off by consuming a large quantity of drugs and alcohol with him. However, Fiore instead orders the Saint of Killers to kill Fiore himself and continue his mission after Jesse uses Genesis to tell him to find peace". Having deduced God's love of jazz to mean he must be in New Orleans, Jesse, Tulip and Cassidy search jazz bars looking for God, with the former appalled when a man in a dog costume is presented as being called God. While Jesse follows another lead, Tulip and Cassidy go to a house owned by Denis, seemingly a friend of Cassidy's, while Tulip leaves to divorce her estranged husband Viktor. Watching an infomercial at Denis' house, Cassidy recognizes the actor who played the imposter God who spoke to Jesse's congregation, learning that the actor had been executed in order to be sent to Heaven to impersonate God. Cassidy reveals to Jesse that Tulip went to Viktor and may be in danger; feeling betrayed by Tulip's marriage, Jesse considers killing Viktor before Cassidy persuades him not to, claiming Tulip has never stopped loving Jesse (both Tulip and Cassidy keeping their previous sexual encounter a secret from Cassidy). However, after they leave, the Saint of Killers shows up an kills Viktor, and his daughter informs the Saint of Killers where to find the trio. At Denis' house, Jesse, Tulip and Cassidy are just able to escape before the Saint of Killers shows up; while Jesse seeks a replacement soul for the Saint of Killers in an effort to stop his rampage, Tulip learns that Denis is Cassidy's son.

After Jesse uses a fragment of his own soul to control and imprison the Saint of Killers, he, Tulip and Cassidy participate in a game where people get shot at while wearing a bulletproof vest, and they trick the other players in order to rob their money. Afterwards, Denis tells his father that he is dying from congestive heart failure and wants to be turned into a vampire to survive, but Cassidy declines. On a phone call, Cassidy asks someone called Seamus for advice on how to handle Denis, and he is advised not to turn him into a vampire. However, Cassidy declines this advice and turns Denis into a vampire, allowing Denis to survive an attempt on the group's lives by assassins working for the Grail, a powerful organization working to preserves the lineage of Jesus Christ for the apocalypse and fights relentlessly any conflicting lore, which includes Jesse and Genesis. As Jesse forms a truce with Grail leader Herr Starr, and realises the man in the dog costume whom he had rejected was in fact the actual God in disguise, Cassidy bonds with his son, who appears to have no control over his vampire desires. However, after the Saint of Killers is freed and comes after the group again, he is sent back to Hell by a superintendent from Hell associated with Herr Starr. An ambulance that Jesse called to take his friends to the hospital subsequently then brings Tulip and Cassidy to Herr Starr instead, who reveals his plans for Jesse to serve as the new messiah to them. In the aftermath, as Cassidy and Tulip decide to leave Jesse, Cassidy realizes that Denis cannot control his vampire desires (and had been seeking for form a vampiric coven via followers of the dating service Les Enfants du Sang (The Children of Blood) and locks him out of his house into the sunlight to burn, killing him. After Tulip is shot fatally by spying Grail agents Lara Featherstone, and Jesse is unable to use Genesis to save her, having the ability to on losing his soul fragment, prevents Cassidy from turning her into a vampire, leading to her death. In a cliffhanger ending, Jesse and Cassidy then drive Tulip's body to Angelville, as Cassidy tells Jesse he hates him, a sentiment to which Jesse agrees.

Season Three (2018)

In the third season, Jesse and Cassidy arrive at Angelville with Tulip's body looking for Jesse's grandmother, a voodoo queen capable of resurrecting her from Purgatory. She sends Jesse and Cassidy on an errand to procure the things she needs for the ritual, during the course of which Cassidy reveals his affair with Tulip to Jesse. When Gran'ma L'Angelle is alone with Cassidy and Tulip's body, she offers him a favor for returning Jesse home, before coaxing Tulip back to life once Jesse has returned. Alive again, Tulip tells Cassidy and Jesse that she was shot by the female Grail agent; while Cassidy wants revenge right away, Jesse presses his friends to focus on escaping his deal with Gran'ma first (which will prevent him from leaving the property), leading to further tension. Realising his extended family is getting suspicious of Cassidy's healing capacities, and will execute him on realising he is a vampire, Jesse tries to make up with his friend and warn him about Angelville, but Cassidy will not listen. While Jesse is away with Jody trying to recruit new customers for his grandmother, Cassidy asks Gran'ma L'Angelle for a love spell, before Jody and T.C. (experienced vampire killers) find out he is a vampire, and hang him upside-down from a tree, planning for him to be incinerated by the sunlight of the next day. Jesse intervenes by agreeing to re-open "The Tombs" — a drug-friendly fight club he would run as a teenager — and to arrange a fight between Cassidy and the customer locked there, acting as master of ceremonies.

After Cassidy winds his fight, Jesse chops him into pieces and tries to ship him away in a parcel before he is made to participate in another fight, knowing he will regenerate once his pieces are back together. When it turns out that Cassidy has seemingly "escaped", Jesse tells the spectators that God is missing and that the Tombs are closed again, only for Cassidy returns to the ring to fight Jesse (angered at having been cut into pieces, and believing Jesse's true reasons for sending him away having been to keep him away from Tulip), ending with Jesse stabbing Cassidy with a stake just as Tulip shows up. After making sure Cassidy is alive, Jesse and Tulip make up, and she sends Cassidy off on a bus to New Orleans, reluctantly telling him that she does not love him. After going binge-drinking in a depressive spiral, Cassidy tries to meet other vampires in New Orleans, using the "vampire dating service" he had seen Denis use, only the website to be for role-play after finding his date to have fake fangs. Despondent, Cassidy resumes his binge, drunknely allowing the Grail to kidnap him and stage a fake video message from Cassidy begging Jesse to rescue him from their grasp, only for cloaked figures to storm the room and rescue Cassidy. Awakening in a basement, Cassidy finds himself before a cult of vampire worshippers known as the Children of Blood (of which his date was a member), whose leader, Eccarius, reveals himself to be another real vampire, possessing more supernatural powers than Cassidy as a result of drinking the blood of his human disciples after turning them into vampires. While initially revolted by this scheme, leaving, Cassidy returns to Eccarius, intrigued by his powers and offer of companionship with Cassidy.

As Cassidy befriends Eccarius, he takes part in his scheme with the Children of Blood, even biting one of their disciples. When a gang of priest assassins and warrior nuns, hired by the Grail, attempt to kill Eccarius and arrest Cassidy, they are defeated by Cassidy, and the duo become lovers. Unbeknownst to Cassidy, however, Eccarius has been killing all the victims he turned into vampires in order to maintain his abilities (in-fact derived from a vampire consuming the blood of another vampire). The following day, Cassidy and Eccarius capture Grail operative Hoover and turn him into a vampire. As Eccarius prepares to drain and kill Hoover, Cassidy finds out about Eccarius' previous killings and confronts him, unwittingly allowing Hoover to escape, before being knocked out by Eccarius. On Cassidy's awakening, Eccarius unsuccessfully attempts to convince Cassidy to go along with his scheme, before ordering his followers to imprison him. However, Cassidy manages to convince the Children of Blood about the truth of their master, and after secretly turning them all into vampires, they turn against Eccarius and devour him. After telling the Children of Blood that they are free to explore the world, Hoover shows up and hides with Cassidy under an umbrella, as the Grail removes the roof of the building, killing all of the Children of Blood (but for two members hidden in coffins), before knocking out Cassidy with a tranquilliser, and bringing him to Masada, the Grail headquarters. At the headquarters, Starr kills Hoover and plans to torture Cassidy, lure Jesse to the base, and kill him, having turned against his previous plan for Jesse to serve as the Grail's new messiah. On awakening in his cell, Cassidy looks up to find an Archangel imprisoned in chains above him.

Season Four (2019)

In a flashforward opening the fourth season, Cassidy and Tulip meet in a hotel room, where they talk about Jesse's death, and kiss. Months earlier in the Middle East, Jesse and Tulip invade Masada to rescue Cassidy, who is being regularly tortured by American mobster Frank Toscani, who teaches "advanced torture" at the "University of the Grail" by repeatedly cutting off the regenerative vampire's foreskin, using it as a key ingredient in face creams (a conspiracy theory Cassidy had championed, ironically proven true). However, despite the torture, Cassidy refuses to leave Masada on Jesse's entrance, seemingly because of their quarrel over Tulip. Disillusioned, Jesse resumes his quest to find God, while Tulip continues plotting to free Cassidy on her own. After ongoing repeated torture by having his foreskin cut again and again in front of a class of Grail students, Cassidy breaks out his cell and prepares to leave the compound, but decides to stay again on finding the Grail's collection of drugs, deciding the pain is worth the later pleasure derived from sneaking out to partake in the drugs.

On returning to his cell, the Archangel asks Cassidy why he doesn't struggle anymore, and Cassidy thinks back to when he was an Irish rebel during the Easter Rising: after his son was killed by British soldiers, he fled from Dublin, before being attacked and turned into a vampire on his way back home, leaving him resigned to not return to his family. In the present, when Cassidy's angel cellmate tells him that the angels were moved by his fate, his high spirits are restored, and he resolves to actually escape. As Tulip makes her way to Cassidy's cell after infiltrating the compound, only to find it empty. Elsewhere, Cassidy is rolled to the helipad preparing to bring him to a cosmetics factory in Bensonhurst for repeated industrial torture, before using one of the angel's feather to pick his locks, break free, killing his guards, and Frank. Just as he is about to reunite with Tulip, he is arrested by Featherstone. Being mistaken for a Grail agent, Tulip is assigned as a valet to visiting celestial emissary Jesus Christ, who, sensing that she is in trouble, agrees to help her free Cassidy from the dungeons. However, before they get to his cell, Cassidy escapes himself by killing the Archangel, allowing him to revive himself and free them both, flying out of the roof of the compound carrying Cassidy. At Kamal's motel and bar, outside the compound, Tulip and Jesus track down Cassidy and the Archangel, who have become drinking buddies. After they learn that Jesse is wanted for murder, Cassidy suggests they start looking for Jesse and help him, only for Tulip and Jesus to go on a joyride. The Archangel then tries to persuade Cassidy to take his chances with Tulip, something the vampire dismisses, only to be charmed by the complexity of the Archangel's relationship with his lover, a Demon, as they simultaneously dance, mate, kill one another, and revive: the couple being the parents of Genesis. On Tulip's and Jesus' return, the former agrees to go with Cassidy to find Jesse.

Posing as a duo of CIA agents known as "The Americans", Tulip and Cassidy arrive in Australia to look for Jesse, finding that he had been shot by Eugene, before being taken by the Saint of Killers, who wants Jesse to hunt down and kill God with him. Tulip and Cassidy follow Jesse to the Outback, using clues left by God to follow him by plane to the Lost Apostle, where they snatch up from the ground. However, on their arrival, God has the Grail agents set off a nuclear bomb, knocking Jesse off the plane as Cassidy holds onto his arm; Jesse then uses "The Word" of Genesis to make Cassidy let him go. Mourning Jesse's death, Tulip and Cassidy return to Willamsburg, where they retrieve the real Humperdoo from Tulip's former associate Dany, hidden in a synagogue at Jesse's request. Planning to kill Humperdoo in order to take revenge on God, neither can bring themselves to do so, and they care for him over the following months. Over this time, Cassidy and Tulip become a couple again. Months later, God finally tells Herr Starr where Humperdoo is, and Grail agents snatches the Messiah from Tulip and Cassidy and return him to Masada. As Cassidy and Tulip proceed to the Middle East, back to the Masada, Jesse is resurrected by God, who bites out his eye before sending back into the path of Tulip and Cassidy.

One hour before the Apocalypse is set to take place, Cassidy, Jesse, and Tulip sneak into Masada with the help of the Archangel and the Demon. As they try to locate the Messiah, they get separated. God tries to tempt both Cassidy and Tulip ending with the vampire being dismembered and disemboweled, sorrowfully admitting to Tulip that he has agreed to serve God, and Tulip left trapped in an office. Once Tulip is freed, a restored Cassidy attempts to prevent her from killing Humperdoo, but on realising that he is unwilling to kill her to prevent this, reluctantly kills Humperdoo himself, thus preventing Apocalypse. Two years later, Jesse and Tulip have a baby daughter, when the Grail has finally located God at the Alamo, whom Jesse tricks into returning to Heaven so that the Saint of Killers can kill him, while Cassidy has left them forever. Forty years later, Cassidy meets with Jesse's and Tulip's daughter Lucy (who looks identical to Tulip) at the graves of her parents, who fondly reminiscences of her parents' stories about Cassidy. After their talk, Lucy asks Cassidy whether she will see him again: looking up at the sky for a moment, he says "Jaysus, I hope so." before casually placing his umbrella aside on a grave and walking into the sunlight (hoping to reunite with his friends again in Heaven).

Gen V (2023–present)
On September 20, 2020, a spin-off of Amazon Prime Video's streaming television adaptation of the Boys (later titled Gen V) was announced, with Craig Rosenberg writing and executive producing the series with Eric Kripke, Seth Rogen, Evan Goldberg, James Weaver, Neal H. Moritz, Pavun Shetty, Michaela Starr, Garth Ennis, Darick Robertson, Sarah Carbiener, Erica Rosbe, Aisha Porter-Christie, Judalina Neira, and Zak Schwartz. On September 27, 2021, Amazon gave the order for the series and Michele Fazekas and Tara Butters were set as showrunners and executive producers of the series. On October 2, 2020, Kripke stated the Hunger Games-inspired series would focus on the G-Men, serving as a loose adaptation of the "We Gotta Go Now" arc of The Boys in which had Cassidy appeared in an epilogue capacity. Sharing his excitement on the series' differences from The Boys, Eric Kripke indicated interest in vampires being included in the series, saying:

"Much like Mork & Mindy spun-off from Happy Days — which is an insane and true fact — our spinoff will exist in the Vought Cinematic Universe, yet have a tone and style all its own. It’s our take on a college show, with an ensemble of fascinating, complicated, and sometimes deadly Young Supes. Michele [Fazekas] and Tara [Butters] are stone-cold geniuses, we’re thrilled to have them steer this ship, and grateful to Sony and Amazon for the opportunity. We love this show and can’t wait for you to see it. Also, Baywatch Nights spun-off from Baywatch, and it had vampires. Vampires!"

GraphicAudio's The Boys (2020)
In 2020, all 98 issues of The Boys comic book series and the epilogue series Dear Becky were adapted into seven full cast audiobooks produced by GraphicAudio, beginning from May 2020, with all volumes numbering a combined 31 hours in length. In the second audiobook, Michael John Casey voices Proinsias Cassidy, adapting his epilogue cameo appearance from the G-Men arc "We Gotta Go Now".

Powers and abilities
Cassidy is a vampire with superhuman strength and speed that can easily rip regular humans apart, though he has no formal training, allowing Jesse to easily beat him without taking any injuries (except for a broken breastbone which occurred when Cassidy offered his hand in friendship and then sucker punched Jesse). Cassidy can survive any physical wound although he feels the full pain associated with the injury. He can heal superhumanly fast, and drinking blood allows him to accelerate the process. The only thing that can kill him is being directly in sunlight for a period of time, though he can stand indirect exposure with discomfort. Although Cassidy needs blood to sustain himself, he does not need human or even fresh blood, preferring instead the taste of beer or whiskey, leaving him lanky and thin. He generally drinks blood from live humans only if they threaten him. On being revived as a human, Cassidy becomes heavyset (with strong arms) over the years, growing his hair out into a ponytail, wearing a Father Ted t-shirt, and wielding a small axe to keep out rowdy Irish-Americans acting like "Stage Irishmen" on St. Patrick's Day.

In the third season of the 2016–2019 AMC television series adaptation, Cassidy learns from Eccarius that by drinking the blood of another vampire, he can additionally make use of the vampiric abilities of hypnosis, animal transformation, and flight.

Development

On March 24, 2015, Joe Gilgun was announced to have been cast as Proinsias Cassidy as one of the main characters in AMC's Preacher, with the first season serving as a loose prequel to the comic book storyline before serving as a direct adaptation of the Preacher comic book series from the second season onwards. Sam Catlin had found Gilgun, to which Evan Goldberg said, "The first audition Sam saw was Joe and he kept saying, 'You guys have got to see this guy. It's a weird tape that he filmed in his mother's basement", to which he added, "It was one of those weird things where we just didn't watch it for weeks. We met with 100 other people." However, after watching the audition tape, Rogen and Goldberg were impressed. Both men first met Gilgun during a Skype call with Rogen noting, "[...] it was like talking to Cassidy. He was the guy. There was no one who was even close to a second choice for that role. If we hadn't gotten him, I don't know what the f— we would've done."

Speaking of his portrayal of Cassidy, Gilgun remarked that "They let me by myself", while furthering that sentiment by stating, "They let me run riot and be a total a–hole and do my job [...] There's not the right words in the right order to describe it. 'Thanks' just feels a bit empty. And they pay me! They pay me to be a complete wanker every single day! And I’ve been doing that for years without making a f—ing penny." Speaking of the casting of Gilgun, Seth Rogen said: "It's one of those things that happens only a few times throughout your career, where you just go 'Oh, it's you. You're the character that is written on the page'... You could tell Joe's lived like 100 lifetimes, and he's probably done some shit you do not want to hear about, but at the same time, he's one of the most fun, loving people you'll ever be around. And it was exactly what the character needed to be." Gilgun was part of the main cast of all four seasons of Preacher, which premiered on 22 May 2016 and concluded on 29 September 2019. Additionally, Gilgun was also an executive producer of the show, producing half of its third season and all of its fourth.

Gilgun spoke with The Wall Street Journal in an interview about the filming of Cassidy's 30,000 feet plane-fall scene from above a small Texas town "It's his introduction, so it has to be big, it has to be fast, it has to be exciting." Gilgun spoke of preparation required to film scene, "I was so terrified [...] I knew the scene was coming up in the pilot, and that was my biggest scene of the whole stuff. As an actor, if you've got limited stuff, you can obsess over it." Gilgun went on to describe the process involved with a week's worth of rehearsal for that particular scene, "We learned the fight to a 'T,'" he said. In an interview with Rolling Stone, Rogen recalled the occasion to which he thought of the idea, during a "crazy fight scene", of Cassidy falling out of a plane "[...] But I thought we needed something to match the crazy, careless vibe of this character in the middle of it — so [Goldberg] and I said, we want to actually throw a guy out of the plane. Everyone thought we were joking [...]", clarifying that it was only after bringing up the matter, three days later, questioning how such a feat was going to be achieve that "[...] people realized that yes, we're dead fucking serious here", before describing his favorite scene in the show to be the one simply involving Jesse and Cassidy sitting in a jail cell and arguing over the nature of faith, along with the concepts good and evil, commenting, "One of my favorite things about the books were the bickering theological discussions the characters would have. We knew we could do the crazy stuff. But when I watched them film that scene, I thought, okay, this is special. This is how I felt when I first read the comics".

Merchandise
Following Preachers premiere, Funko unveiled a range of Pop! Television Vinyl figures based on the series, including Proinsias Cassidy, released on May 29, 2016. On June 14, 2016, Madmans Mike Allred created a retro-pop style custom Preacher comic cover as promotion for the AMC series, featuring the trio of Jesse, Cassidy and Tulip slyly celebrating having cut themselves free from the hands that have been pulling their strings, with covers by such artists as Preacher co-creator Steve Dillon and Preacher cover artist Glenn Fabry being available when singing up to the Preacher Insiders Club. On June 17, 2016, Monster Swamp artist Dustin Nguyen created a custom Preacher comic cover featuring Cassidy after having recently fed.

Reception
Joe Gilgun's depiction of Proinsias Cassidy in the AMC television adaptation has been positively received, and his interpersonal relationships with Eccarius (played by Adam Croasdell), Jesse Custer (played by Dominic Cooper) and Tulip O'Hare (played by Ruth Negga), and bisexuality have been lauded.

The characterisation of Cassidy in Garth Ennis' Preacher comic book series has been complimented, analyzed as a stereotypical depiction of a European in fiction, while the character's characterisation in Ennis' The Boys comic book series and relationship/sponsorship with Billy Butcher has been praised.

References

Preacher (comics)
The Boys characters
Fictional drug addicts
Fictional murderers
Fictional tobacco addicts
British comics characters
Characters created by Garth Ennis
Comics characters introduced in 1995
DC Comics fantasy characters
Vertigo Comics characters
DC Comics television characters
Fictional hypnotists and indoctrinators
Male characters in television
Television characters introduced in 2016
DC Comics characters who can move at superhuman speeds
DC Comics characters with accelerated healing
DC Comics characters with superhuman strength
DC Comics male supervillains
DC Comics supervillains
Dynamite Entertainment characters
Fictional characters with energy-manipulation abilities
Fictional characters with fire or heat abilities
Fictional characters with superhuman senses
Fictional characters with X-ray vision
Fictional Irish people
Fictional immigrants to the United States
Fictional mass murderers
Fictional murderers of children
Fictional characters with post-traumatic stress disorder
Fictional people with acquired American citizenship
Fictional torturers and interrogators
Fictional vampires
Fictional war veterans
WildStorm characters
Fictional bisexual males
Fictional LGBT characters in television